Koondrook is a town situated on the Murray River, Victoria, Australia. At the 2016 census, Koondrook had a population of 832.

History
The Barrapa Barrapa Indigenous Australians are believed to have occupied the Koondrook area, prior to European settlement commencing in 1843. The Post Office opened on 1 March 1879.
In 1889 the Kerang-Koondrook Tramway was opened, linking the town to the Victorian railway network. The tramway was officially closed on 3 March 1981.

Present
Koondrook is connected by a bridge to its twin town of Barham in the neighbouring state of New South Wales. Industry in the area includes dairying on the river flats, and citrus production using irrigation supplied from the Murray River. Timber from the surrounding state forests is used in the production of redgum timber and furniture. Citrus grown in the area is used by a local processing plant to produce 'The Great Australian Squeeze' organic orange juice, which is distributed in local grocery stores and across Australia in an agreement with Woolworths supermarket.

Fishing and camping in the area popular activities for tourists in the surrounding state forests. The forests are important breeding areas for colonial waterbirds and are visited by migratory birds.

The town, in conjunction with neighbouring township Barham across the Murray, has an Australian rules football team competing in the Central Murray Football League.

Notable people
Melbourne Cup winning jockey Roy Higgins and AFL premiership player Brent Guerra were born in Koondrook.

Climate
The Köppen Climate Classification subtype for this climate is "BSk" (Tropical and Subtropical Steppe Climate).
Climate in this area has mild differences between highs and lows, and there is adequate rainfall year-round.  The Köppen Climate Classification subtype for this climate is "Cfb" (Marine West Coast Climate/Oceanic climate).

References

External links

Koondrook Website - Koondrook Website
Gannawarra Shire Council - Official Website
Murray Darling Basin Commission - State forests around Koondrook

Towns in Victoria (Australia)
Populated places on the Murray River